The William Reid Stakes is a horse race of Moonee Valley Racing Club Group 1 thoroughbred racing at Weight for Age, for three year olds and older, run over a distance of 1200 metres at Moonee Valley Racecourse, Melbourne, Australia in the autumn. Total prize money for the race is A$1,000,000.

History

The race has been won by a few champions including Manikato who won the race five consecutive times from 1979 to 1983. Also noted champions Black Caviar and Miss Andretti won the race before being successful at Royal Ascot.

From 2005 to 2007 it was the second leg of the Global Sprint Challenge, preceded by the Lightning Stakes and followed by the King's Stand Stakes. It has now been replaced as an Australian leg of the Global Sprint Challenge series by The Age Classic.

Name
The William Reid Stakes was named after William Reid, a former committee member of the Moonee Valley Racing Club. Originally from Morayshire, Scotland, William Reid was a Victorian Banker and racehorse owner who died in 1923. He was the owner of a number of prominent racehorses in the early 1900s including Uncle Sam, who won the Caulfield Cup in 1912 and 1914. Uncle Sam also ran third in the Melbourne Cup in 1912 who stood at his Glen Orla Stud in Sunbury.

During the period 1996–2001 the race was held on the Australia Day holiday weekend. In 2002 the event was moved to March while the Norman Carlyon Stakes which was the same distance and race conditions was rescheduled for the Australia Day holiday weekend. Later in 2010 that event was renamed to the Australia Stakes and to this date continues to be raced under the given name.

 1925–1993 - William Reid Stakes
 1994–1995 - Australia Made Stakes
 1996–2009 - Australia Stakes
 2010 onwards - William Reid Stakes

Distance

 1925–1972 - 6 furlongs (~1200 metres)
 1973 onwards - 1200 metres

Grade

 1925–1979 - Principal race
 1980–1986 - Group 2 
 1987 onwards - Group 1

Venue

In 1995 the race was held at Flemington Racecourse.

Foreign entries

In 2005, Cape of Good Hope became the first overseas runner to win this race.

Winners

 2022 - September Run
 2021 - Masked Crusader
2020 - Loving Gaby
2019 - Sunlight
2018 - Hellbent
2017 - Silent Sedition
2016 - Flamberge
2015 - Lucky Hussler
2014 - Spirit Of Boom
2013 - Black Caviar
2012 - Foxwedge
2011 - Black Caviar
2010 - Turffontein
2009 - Apache Cat
2008 - Apache Cat
2007 - Miss Andretti
2006 - Virage De Fortune
2005 - Cape of Good Hope
2004 - Regimental Gal
2003 - Yell
2002 - Toledo
2001 - Bomber Bill
2000 - Miss Pennymoney
1999 - Grand Archway
1998 - Stella Cadente
1997 - Spartacus
1996 - Strategic
1995 - Hareeba
1994 - Lady Jakeo
1993 - Spanish Mix
1992 - Wrap Around
1991 - Redelva
1990 - Lightning Bend
1989 - Zedative
1988 - Vo Rogue
1987 - Canny Lass
1986 - Campaign King
1985 - River Rough
1984 - Qubeau
1983 - Manikato
1982 - Manikato
1981 - Manikato
1980 - Manikato
1979 - Manikato
1978 - Family Of Man
1977 - Toy Show
1976 - Lord Dudley
1975 - Leica Show
1974 - All Shot
1973 - All Shot
1972 - Dual Choice
1971 - Tango Miss
1970 - Crewman
1969 - Magic Ruler
1968 - Winfreux
1967 - Marmion
1966 - Star Affair
1965 - Contempler
1964 - Check Up
1963 - Nikalapko
1962 - New Statesman
1961 - Lady Major
1960 - Planetoid
1959 - Merger
1958 - Golden Doubles
1957 - Golden Doubles
1956 - Joda Boy
1955 - Flying Halo
1954 - St. Joel
1953 - Flying Halo
1952 - Flying Halo
1951 - Comic Court
1950 - Filipino
1949 - Comedy Prince
1948 - Chanak
1947 - Bravesia
1946 - Tranquil Star
1945 - David’s Last
1944 - Reception
1943 - race not held
1942 - Chatasan
1941 - All Veil
1940 - Magic Circle
1939 - Amiable
1938 - Hua
1937 - Pamelus
1936 - race not held
1935 - Heros
1934 - Heros
1933 - Waltzing Lily
1932 - Middle Watch
1931 - Mystic Peak
1930 - Figure
1929 - Gothic
1928 - Translator
1927 - Heroic
1926 - The Night Patrol
1925 - The Night Patrol

See also
 List of Australian Group races
 Group races

References

Group 1 stakes races in Australia
Open sprint category horse races